Tinguta is a rural locality (a station) in Svetloyarsky District, Volgograd Oblast, Russia. The population was 10 as of 2010.

Geography 
Tinguta is located 55 km southwest of Svetly Yar (the district's administrative centre) by road. Prudovy is the nearest rural locality.

References 

Rural localities in Svetloyarsky District